

Qualified teams

Bracket

Quarter-finals

Sweden vs France

United States vs New Zealand

Brazil vs Japan

Great Britain vs Canada

Semi-finals

France vs Japan

Canada vs United States

Bronze medal match

Canada vs France

Gold medal match

United States vs Japan

References

Knockout stage
knock
knock
2012 in Brazilian women's football
knock
Knock
2012–13 in New Zealand association football
Knock
Great Britain at the 2012 Women's Olympic Football Tournament